Last Triumph is an artist management and booking agency based in Minneapolis, Minnesota. It also became the world's first B Corporation certified artist management and booking agency in November 2014.

Company history
In 2014, Jarod Hadaway, (founder of Last Triumph), was responsible for the launch Createch Studio, based in Arlington Hills area of Saint Paul, Minnesota. It was founded as a community recording studio with the city of Saint Paul to allow young people in the Arlington Hills community to schedule studio time to create and record music. Partnering with the MacArthur Foundation, Createch received a $100,000 grant for the project. During the same year, music produced by the label was featured on Oxygen TV.

In late 2014, the label became the world's first B Corporation certified record label.

Last Triumph announced that they would again be hosting The Take Off Tour at SXSW.

Artist roster
 Yatao
 Reina del Cid
 Joshua Lee Turner
 The Other Favorites
 Carson McKee
 Nooky Jones
 No Tent

External links
 Official website

References

Independent record labels based in Minnesota